Roman Vasilievich Sklyar (born 8 May 1971) is a Kazakhstani politician and economist who is serving as the First Deputy Prime Minister since January 2022.

Sklyar was the deputy akim of Pavlodar from 2005 to 2006, deputy and first deputy akim of Pavlodar Region from 2008 to 2011, Vice Minister of Transport and Communications from 2011 to 2013, member of Mazhilis and Vice Minister of the National Economy in 2016, Vice and First Vice Minister for Investment and Development from 2016 to 2019, and Minister of Industry and Infrastructure Development in 2019.

Biography

Early life and education 
Sklyar was born in the city of Pavlodar. He graduated from the Pavlodar State University with a degree in Civil Engineering, Moscow Institute of Modern Business with a degree in Economics and the Kazakh Institute of Law and International Relations.

Career 
He began his career in 1989 as a fitter and installer at the Ekibastuzugleavtomatika MNU, and later worked as a safety engineer at Vakhinvest JV and in various commercial structures. 

From 2005 to 2006, Sklyar held the posts of chief of staff, deputy akim of Pavlodar. From 2006 to 2007 he worked as head of the infrastructure development department of the apparatus of the akim of Astana. From 2007, he worked as the Director of the Department of Energy and Public Utilities of the city of Astana. From 2008 to 2011, he held the posts of deputy and first deputy akim of Pavlodar Region.

In May 2011, Sklyar became the Vice Minister of Transport and Communications. From 2014 to 2016 he worked as vice president of Kazakhstan Temir Zholy JSC.

In 20 March 2016 elections, Sklyar was elected to the Mazhilis from the Nur Otan party list where he served as Chairman of the Committee on Economic Reform and Regional Development. From May to December 2016 he worked as Vice Minister of the National Economy. 

On 23 December 2016, Sklyar became the Vice Minister for Investment and Development. He was then the First Vice Minister from 18 January 2018. After Sagintayev's government was dismissed on 21 February 2019, Sklyar became the Minister of Industry and Infrastructure Development on 25 February under PM Askar Mamin. 

On 18 September 2019, he was appointed as the Deputy Prime Minister.

References

1971 births
Living people
Nur Otan politicians
People from Pavlodar
People from Pavlodar Region
Government ministers of Kazakhstan
Kazakhstani people of Russian descent
Deputy Prime Ministers of Kazakhstan
First Deputy Prime Ministers of Kazakhstan